Pant-y-crug is a hamlet in the  community of Melindwr, Ceredigion, Wales, which is 71.5 miles (115 km) from Cardiff and 175 miles (281.6 km) from London. Pant-y-crug is represented in the Senedd by Elin Jones (Plaid Cymru) and is part of the Ceredigion constituency in the House of Commons.

Etymology
The name derives from the Welsh language meaning "the valley of the cairn".

References

See also
List of localities in Wales by population 

Villages in Ceredigion